Daniel Jerome Jenrette (born January 11, 2002), known professionally as Dro Kenji , is an American rapper and songwriter from Virginia. He is currently signed to Internet Money Records and 10K Projects.

Career
In 2019, at the age of 17, Dro Kenji started rapping. In June 2021, he released his 14-track project Fuck Your Feelings. In January 2022, he released his mixtape With or Without You with appearances from Scorey, Highway, and Internet Money. In August 2022, he released his album Anywhere but Here with appearances from DC the Don, Mike Dimes, NoCap, Ka$hdami, and midwxst.

Musical style
Steve Juon writing for Rap Reviews describes Dro Kenji's music in the following manner: "His music is not an evolution, a revolution, or any kind of solution. It’s just the same nihilistic world view of a generation that grew up in a world where you had to live it up fast because Death comes even faster."

References

External links 
 

Living people
21st-century American rappers
2002 births
African-American male rappers
People from South Carolina